Gholam Rostam (also Romanized as Gholām Rostam; also known as Deh-e Gholām Rostam) is a village in Margan Rural District, in the Central District of Hirmand County, Sistan and Baluchestan Province, Iran. At the 2006 census, its population was 115, in 25 families.

References 

Populated places in Hirmand County